Ḩaşbān Asfal is a sub-district located in the Al-Misrakh District, Taiz Governorate, Yemen. Ḩaşbān Asfal had a population of 1,564 according to the 2004 census.

Villages
Al-damanah village.
'Aruykibuh  village.
Al-maesuq  village.
Al-muhabih  village.
Al-zuhur  village.
Al-mahatuh  village.
Al-qahfuh  village.
Fafrat Al-sanahi village.
Habab village.
Hawl Al-Souq village.
Al-'Ariduh village.
Al-ahwab village.
Dar Al-darae village.
Al-jabijab village.
Habil Jabba' village.
Al-Habishah village.
Al-sahlulh village.
Al-'ard village.
Al-saafih village.
Al-muqidihiah village.
Al'ahar village.

References

Sub-districts in Al-Misrakh District